Dean Elliott Wolfe (born May 31, 1956) is the rector of the historic St. Bartholomew's Church in New York City. Previously, he served as the ninth Bishop of Kansas between 2004 and 2017.

Early life and education
Wolfe was born on May 31, 1956, in Dayton, Ohio, to Bill and Millie Wolfe. He was raised in the Church of the Brethren and by the age of 16 was licensed to preach in that church while, at the age of 21, he was given responsibility for a parish. He studied at Miami University and graduated with a Bachelor of Arts degree in political science and religion in 1987, and then worked in sales and marketing. He joined the Episcopal Church when he was studying at Bethany Theological Seminary. Later, he enrolled at Virginia Theological Seminary from where he earned his Master of Divinity degree in 1992. The latter also awarded him a Doctor of Divinity in 2004.

Ordained ministry
Wolfe was ordained deacon and priest in 1992 at Grace Cathedral in San Francisco. He became assistant priest and then as associate rector of St. Clement's Church in Berkeley, California. In 1994, he became associate rector of Trinity Church in Boston, while in 1997 he became vice rector of the Church of St. Michael and All Angels in Dallas, Texas.

Bishop of Kansas
On July 12, 2003, Wolfe was elected on the fifth ballot to serve as Coadjutor Bishop of Kansas. He was consecrated at Grace Cathedral on November 8, 2003, by the Bishop of Western Louisiana, D. Bruce MacPherson. He succeeded as diocesan bishop on January 1, 2004. During his episcopacy he revised the campus ministry program, focused on a diocesan youth ministry, and established the Bishop Kemper School for Ministry. He also officiated the first authorized Episcopal same-sex marriage in the diocese. Wolfe retired on February 1, 2017.

Rector of St. Bartholomew's
In 2016, Wolfe was elected as rector of St. Bartholomew's Church in New York City and accepted on November 13, 2016. He commenced his ministry on February 5, 2017, and was formally installed as the 13th rector by the Bishop of New York, Andrew M. L. Dietsche, on June 9, 2017.

See also
 List of Episcopal bishops of the United States
 Historical list of the Episcopal bishops of the United States

References 

Living people
1956 births
Episcopal bishops of Kansas
Miami University alumni
Virginia Theological Seminary alumni
People from Dayton, Ohio
Converts to Anglicanism